Van Ness station is an underground Muni Metro station on the Market Street subway at the intersection of Market Street and Van Ness Avenue (U.S. Route 101) in San Francisco, California. The station consists of a concourse mezzanine on the first floor down, and a single island platform on the second level down. Service at the station began in February 1980.

The station has suffered flooding during heavy rainstorms, including one in October 2009, and another in December 2014 which damaged an electrical equipment room. In February 2017, the SFMTA signed a $1.9 million contract to repair water-damaged wiring in the room. Surface stops on Van Ness Avenue at Market Street are the southern end of the Van Ness Bus Rapid Transit route, which began service on April 1, 2022. The northeast headhouse was closed on March 11, 2023, for an estimated six months during construction of an adjacent building.

Under the proposed western variant of the planned Better Market Street project, the outbound F stop would be moved across the intersection.

References

External links 

Muni Metro stations
Civic Center, San Francisco
Market Street (San Francisco)
Railway stations located underground in California
Railway stations in the United States opened in 1980